Gong Maoxin and Peng Hsien-yin were the defending champions, but lost in the final to Hsieh Cheng-peng and Yang Tsung-hua 6–2, 6–2.

Seeds

Draw

References
 Main Draw

OEC Kaohsiung - Doubles
2015 Doubles
2015 in Taiwanese tennis
Tennis tournaments in Taiwan